The women's long jump event at the 1975 Pan American Games was held in Mexico City on 14 October.

Medalists

Results

Qualification

Qualifying distance: 6.20

Final

References

Athletics at the 1975 Pan American Games
1975